Tricoryne is a genus of perennial herbs in the family Asphodelaceae, subfamily Hemerocallidoideae. All species are native to Australia with two species extending to New Guinea; within Australia they occur in all 6 states and the Northern Territory.

Species
 Tricoryne anceps R.Br.  - New Guinea, Queensland
 Tricoryne corynothecoides Keighery   - Western Australia
 Tricoryne elatior R.Br. - Yellow Rush-lily - all 6 states plus Northern Territory
 Tricoryne humilis Endl.  - Western Australia
 Tricoryne muricata Baker  - Queensland
 Tricoryne platyptera Rchb.f - New Guinea, Queensland
 Tricoryne simplex R.Br.  - New South Wales
 Tricoryne tenella R.Br.  - Mallee Rush-lily - Western Australia, South Australia (including Kangaroo Island)

References

 
Asphodelaceae genera
Asparagales of Australia
Endemic flora of Australia